Floß is a municipality in the district of Neustadt an der Waldnaab in Bavaria, Germany.

Geography

Town subdivision 
The civil parish Floß is composed of 35 official named districts.:

Characteristics

History 
The origin of settlement goes back to friars. The first mention is found in 948: "Occisio paganorum ad flozzun", which is translated as "the Hungarians were conquered by the duke near Floß". The town was in possession of House of Hohenstaufen and was awarded market town status by its sovereigns, Markgraf Friedrich von Brandenburg and Pfalzgraf Johann, in 1421. Since 1438/39 the market town was under control of Wittelsbacher. In 1556, Protestantism is first mentioned, and in 1648, a Jewish community.

Subsequently it was part of Duchy of the Wittelsbacher Pfalz-Sulzbach, which belonged since 1777 to Kingdom of Bavaria. It has its own market tribunal with municipal rights. Between 1802 and 1809, Floß lost most of its rights in the course of diverse land reforms. The formally commercial relevance faded. A large fire in 1813 almost burned the town to the ground. Baron von Lichtenstein rebuilt it in its current form. From 1885 to 1992 there was a connection to the rail network between Weiden and Eslarn with the railway stations Gailertsreuth, Floß, Haupertsreuth and Grafenreuth.  At  22 April 1945 Floß was taken, after more than twenty years under influence of the NS party, by the American Allies.

Coat of arms 
Blazon: In Gold aus blauen Wellen wachsend ein rot gekrönter schwarzer Adler.
Heraldic animal is a in gold out from blue waves rising red crowned black spread eagle. The emblem is known since the 14th century.

Places of interest 
 The Synagogue, built 1817, vandalised at Crystal Night 1938 and renovated in 1980. It is only occasionally used for religious service by Jewish community of Weiden.
 The Jewish Cemetery, with its oldest decipherable granite headstone from 1692. There are 33 concentration camp victims laid to rest.
 Saint Nikolaus Church, pilgrimage site on Nikolaus Hill.
 Saint John Baptist Church (Lutheran), partially from 16th century.
 Saint John The Baptist Church (Roman Catholic), built from 1910 to 1912.
 Cemetery with 121 victims of the neighbouring concentration camp Flossenbürg
 The Doost, a geotope with round ice-aged granite boulder in the middle of the forest.
 Castle ruin Haselstein, built by 1400, at Floß's backyard mountain.
 In the middle of nature reserve Upper Palatine Forest, well known for its castle ruins, quarries and a European network of rambling trails.

Nowadays Floß is on the Castle Route from Mannheim to Prague and the Golden Route from Nuremberg to Prague as well it is one station of the  EuroVelo cycling route from Prague in the Czech Republic to Paris in France.

Cultural events 
A kermesse (Kirchweih or Kirwa in German) is held on the last Sunday in August, known as Bartholomew Sunday in commemoration of Bartholomew the Apostle. The event is known far beyond the village borders. It is organised on an annually alternating basis by two young men's clubs, the Cylinder-Club and the Floss und Umgebung.

Notable people 
 Lazar Horowitz (1803–1868), Rabbi in Vienna
  (1825–1879), church minister, member of Landtag and Reichtstag 
  (1910–2002), Jewish emigrant to China and the US, noted as a painter
 Richard Baer (1911–1963), National Socialist and SS, commandant of Auschwitz concentration and extermination camp
 Petra Horneber (21 April 1965), sport shooter

Gallery

References

External links 
 official website

Neustadt an der Waldnaab (district)
Upper Palatine Forest